The Immediate Geographic Region of Ipatinga is one of the 3 immediate geographic regions in the Intermediate Geographic Region of Ipatinga, one of the 70 immediate geographic regions in the Brazilian state of Minas Gerais and one of the 509 of Brazil, created by the National Institute of Geography and Statistics (IBGE) in 2017.

Municipalities 
It comprises 22 municipalities:

 Açucena

 Antônio Dias

 Belo Oriente
 Braúnas
 Bugre   
 Coronel Fabriciano   
 Dionísio   
 Dom Cavati  
 Iapu
 Ipaba
 Ipatinga  
 Jaguaraçu   
 Joanésia  
 Marliéria
 Mesquita   
 Naque   
 Periquito    
 Pingo-d'Água    
 Santana do Paraíso   
 São João do Oriente   
 São José do Goiabal
 Timóteo

References 

Geography of Minas Gerais